Mohamed Azath Sanoon Salley (born 18 September 1963) is a Sri Lankan politician and the eighth Governor of the Western Province.

Salley was the deputy mayor of Colombo, and the founder/leader of the National Unity Front (NUF).

He has two children, Amina (daughter) and Nafees (son).

In May 2013, Salley was arrested and later released by the Sri Lankan Forces under the Prevention of Terrorism Act (PTA) after he supposedly called Muslims to launch an "armed struggle" during an interview., the charges were proven to be baseless and he was acquitted.

Salley founded the National Unity Front, a National political party. He was a member of the Central Provincial Council. He worked in partnership with the United Arab Emirates High Commission in Colombo to help the needy during the Islamic Holy Month of Ramazan.

On 3 January 2019 he was sworn in as the eighth Governor of the Western Province. However, as a result of the 2019 Easter Bomb attacks by radical thowheed jamath Islamists, Azath Salley along with all the Muslim politicians were forced to resign after a Political Monk named Athuraliye Rathana protested against Salley's alleged ties to extremists., All the allegations against Azath Salley were baseless and he was acquitted on the 2nd of December 2021.

Salley was somewhat of a controversial figure after the COVID-19 pandemic, as one of the only Muslim leaders in the island to talk against the government's forceful cremation of COVID-19 victims.

Azath Salley Foundation

Before his tenure as deputy mayor of Colombo, Azath Salley founded the Azath Salley Foundation with intent to distribute food and dry rations among the less fortunate people in Sri Lanka.

The foundation donates food, dry rations and financial assistance to less fortunate every year in collaboration with corporate sponsors and high commissions.

National Unity Alliance

Azath Salley is presently the leader of the National Unity Alliance, a registered and active political party in Sri Lanka.

References

Living people
1963 births
Provincial councillors of Sri Lanka
Governors of Western Province, Sri Lanka